The 1995 NCAA Skiing Championships were contested at the Wildcat Mountain Ski Area in Jackson, New Hampshire as the 42nd annual NCAA-sanctioned ski tournament to determine the individual and team national champions of men's and women's collegiate slalom and cross-country skiing in the United States.

Colorado, coached by Richard Rokos, won the team championship, the Buffaloes' thirteenth title overall and second as a co-ed team.

Venue

This year's NCAA skiing championships were hosted by the Wildcat Mountain Ski Area near Jackson, New Hampshire.

These were the seventh championships held in the state of New Hampshire (previously 1958, 1964, 1970, 1978, 1984, and 1992).

Program

Men's events
 Cross country, 20 kilometer classical
 Cross country, 10 kilometer freestyle
 Slalom
 Giant slalom

Women's events
 Cross country, 15 kilometer classical
 Cross country, 5 kilometer freestyle
 Slalom
 Giant slalom

Team scoring

 DC – Defending champions

See also
 List of NCAA skiing programs

References

1995 in sports in New Hampshire
NCAA Skiing Championships
NCAA Skiing Championships
1995 in alpine skiing
1995 in cross-country skiing